Christina Daniela Stumpp (born 16 November 1987 in Backnang) is a German politician of the Christian Democratic Union (CDU) who has been serving as Member of the Bundestag since the 2021 elections, representing the Waiblingen district.

Early career
From February until September 2021, Stumpp worked as advisor to Baden-Württemberg’s State Minister for Rural Affairs and Consumer Protection Peter Hauk.

Political career
Ahead of the Christian Democrats’ leadership election in 2022, Stumpp publicly endorsed Friedrich Merz to succeed Armin Laschet as the party’s chair and joined his campaign team.

References 

1987 births
Living people
Members of the Bundestag for the Christian Democratic Union of Germany
Members of the Bundestag 2021–2025
Members of the Bundestag for Baden-Württemberg
21st-century German women politicians
Female members of the Bundestag
People from Backnang